Lucas David Pratto (born 4 June 1988) is an Argentine professional footballer who plays as a striker for Argentine Primera División club Vélez Sarsfield.

Pratto has been described as possessing unusual technique and ball control for a player of strong physique. His first professional club was Boca Juniors, by whom he was loaned to Argentine sides Tigre and Unión, Norway's Lyn and Chile's Universidad Católica. His performances for the latter prompted a transfer to Italian club Genoa, shortly after which he joined Vélez Sarsfield, first on loan and then permanently, when he was elected Argentina's 2014 Footballer of the Year. He then moved to Brazil, playing for Atlético Mineiro and São Paulo, before returning to Argentina for River Plate in 2018, with whom he won the Copa Libertadores title later that year. In 2021, he joined Dutch club Feyenoord on loan.

Pratto has been capped at international level for Argentina.

Early life 
Pratto was born in La Plata, where he lived most of his early life in the Altos de San Lorenzo neighborhood. He started playing in local club Gimnasia of the Los Hornos neighborhood and was rejected by the youth ranks of Estudiantes de La Plata before eventually making it into the Defensores de Cambaceres youth team, where his brother then played.

Club career

Early career and loan spells

Product of Defensores de Cambaceres lower divisions, Pratto joined Argentine club Boca Juniors in 2006, after a recommendation by Martín Palermo. Once in the La Boca-based team, he was sent to the team's fifth division, where he scored more than 20 goals and formed an attacking partnership with Óscar Trejo.

In June 2007, he was loaned to Tigre, but mostly played for the reserve team in their first season. Leandro Lázzaro's departure to Estudiantes, however, allowed Pratto to break into the starting eleven and challenge the possibility of being the team's first choice striker. Following Lázzaro's absence, Lucas played ten 2008 Clausura games and scored one goal against San Martín de San Juan, which was his side's winning goal in a 2–1 home win at José Dellagiovanna.

On 2 August 2008, Pratto joined Norway's Lyn Fotball on a free loan from Boca, after being recommended by the scout Terje Liverød who helped with the negotiations. On 15 August, Lucas made a goalscoring debut during a 3–1 defeat against Molde FK in a Tippeligaen game as a 71st-minute substitute. Between 2008 and 2009 Pratto made 21 league appearances and scored four goals for Lyn. He then returned to Argentina in mid-2009 to join Boca's first-team squad, then coached by Alfio Basile.

After once again not being considered at the La Bombonera squad, Pratto had another brief loan spell in the first half of 2010, this time at Unión de Santa Fe in the Primera B Nacional.

Universidad Católica 
On 29 June 2010 Pratto joined Chile's Universidad Católica on loan from Boca, this time as part of Gary Medel's contract extension negotiation. In the Chilean club, Pratto scored in his debut against Everton in a 1–1 league draw at Viña del Mar. At first, Lucas was heavily criticized for his bad shape at the Las Condes-based team, but key goals in the end of the season against Universidad de Chile and Cobreloa helped Católica achieve their 10th Campeonato Nacional title. He had an impressive season start in 2011 when he scored six Copa Libertadores goals (including a brace against Grêmio, in a historic 2–1 triumph at Brazil) and six league goals, which allowed him be sold by Boca to Italian Serie A side Genoa for a US$2,4 million fee.

Genoa
Pratto joined the Genovese club on 30 June 2011, being described months before by the club's president Enrico Preziosi as the team's new Diego Milito. He officially debuted as a starter during Genoa's first 2011–12 Coppa Italia game against Nocerina in a 4–3 home win, in which he scored his side's second goal after an assist by Kévin Constant. His Serie A debut was on 11 September in a 2–2 draw with Atalanta for the league's first matchday, and his first goal came on 18 December in a 2–1 victory over Bologna, the match-winner at the 85th minute. His second goal for Coppa Italia was on 24 November against Bari in a 3–2 victory, where once again he scored the match's winning goal, now after an impressive header in the 115th minute during extra-time. Pratto made an attacking partnership with Rodrigo Palacio, but coach Alberto Malesani, by whom he was selected for the first squad, was fired in December 2011. Since that time Lucas failed to play the rest of season, being relegated to the bench by the team's next coaches (Pasquale Marino, the same Malesani and Luigi De Canio).

Vélez Sarsfield

On 7 February 2012 it was reported that Pratto had joined Vélez Sarsfield in a season-long loan deal, with the option to be fully signed by the Argentine club. After a decent first season with the Liniers side, in which he played 20 times and scored 4 goals, Lucas became a starter during Vélez's 2012 Torneo Inicial championship-winning campaign. Pratto made a partnership with Facundo Ferreyra, and played a key role appearing in all 19 games and scoring seven goals.

In January 2013 it was reported that Vélez had come to an agreement with Genoa for the definitive purchase of the player on a three-year contract. On 29 June 2013, Lucas scored the match winner in the Superfinal, the match that concluded the 2012–13 Primera División season, as Vélez defeated Newell's 1–0 and were crowned Super Champions. At the end of the year Pratto was selected as Vélez's best player of the season.

In the start of 2014 he won the Supercopa Argentina with his club, and was the top goalscorer of the Torneo de Transición, with 11 goals. For his performances Pratto was once again selected as Vélez's player of the year, and was honored with the Olimpia de Plata award as Footballer of the Year of Argentina, chosen by Argentine sports media as the best player in the local league.

Atlético Mineiro

On 16 December 2014, Lucas Pratto joined Brazilian club Atlético Mineiro on a four-year contract. Pratto made his unofficial debut and scored his first goal for Atlético in a pre-season friendly against Shakhtar Donetsk, which his new team won 4–2. Pratto also scored in his first official match for the club, against Tupi, for the 2015 Campeonato Mineiro, as well as in his debut in Copa Libertadores for Atlético, scoring the winner in a 1–0 away win against Independiente Santa Fé.

In the second leg of the Campeonato Mineiro semifinals against fierce rivals Cruzeiro, Pratto managed to score a brace with two assists by Guilherme, one of the goals an impressive volley, and helped his team make a 2–1 comeback after trailing in half-time. Atlético were eventually crowned champions of the competition, with Pratto finishing with six goals and being selected for the team of the tournament and as its best player. In July 2015, Pratto became Atlético's highest-ever foreign goalscorer and scored his first-ever hat-trick, with all three goals coming in the first half of a 3–1 home win against São Paulo. He still holds this record as the club's highest-ever foreign goalscorer, with 42 goals.

São Paulo 
On 10 February 2017, Pratto signed a four-year contract with Brazilian club São Paulo FC. The transfer totalled around €12 million, with the São Paulo-based club paying approximately €6 million for 50 per cent of the player's rights. According to Carlos Augusto de Barros e Silva, São Paulo's president, the club would acquire up to 95% of the rights in the future. Atlético Mineiro president Daniel Nepomuceno stated that payment for the remaining shares would occur within three years.

He netted in his debut for Tricolor, in a 2–2 draw against Mirassol, and, three days later, he scored twice in his second match for club, in a 3–2 victory against São Bento. Pratto, along with his compatriot Calleri, is the only debut player at the club to score in his two first official matches.

On 9 July 2017, Pratto lost a penalty kick in a 3–2 loss of São Paulo FC against rivals Santos FC. At the end of this match, he was seven consecutive games without scoring any goal.

River Plate
On 8 January 2018, São Paulo confirmed the selling of Pratto to River Plate for €11.5 million, becoming River's highest ever transfer acquisition.

Pratto scored two goals in the 2018 Copa Libertadores finals against Boca Juniors, once in each leg, helping River to the title.

Feyenoord
On 1 January 2021, Eredivisie club Feyenoord announced the signing of Pratto on loan for the remainder of the season. He made his debut nine days later, in a Rotterdam derby against Sparta in the league, won 2–0 by Feyenoord.

On 9 May, in a 3–0 league defeat to Ajax, Pratto suffered a fracture in his right ankle when challenging for the ball; he underwent surgery on the same day, with an expected recovery time of four to six months.

International career 
Pratto received his first international call-up for Argentina on 12 August 2016, for 2018 FIFA World Cup qualification matches against Uruguay and Venezuela. He started for the national team for the first time in the match against Uruguay on 1 September 2016, and scored his first goal against Venezuela on 7 September. Pratto scored his second international goal helping Argentina to a 3–0 win over Colombia in November 2016.

In the Jorge Sampaoli's first calling up for Argentina, Pratto was not called, in spite of being remembered in Edgardo Bauza's lists.

Style of play 

Pratto has an unusually fast pace for a player with 1.88m, and frequently floats outside the box to assist other players. He has been praised for his technique, ball control, and link-up play. Tactically, Pratto has not usually been deployed as a target man centre forward throughout most of his career, as is commonly the case for a player with a strong physique; he has normally played as a striker or second striker. In his best season with Vélez, he played as a second striker or even as an outside forward, with Facundo Ferreyra occupying the centre-forward role. Upon his arrival at Atlético Mineiro, he started to play in a more central role in the attack, while still contributing with assists and playing in the flanks during the matches.

Personal life 
Pratto was raised by his mother Daniela, helped by his older brother Leandro. Aside from him, Lucas has three other siblings from his father's other family. Pratto has one daughter, Pia, born in 2010, and has tattoos portraying her and his mother. Lucas has an interest on rock and roll, being a fan of AC/DC, Foo Fighters, Kiss and Argentine band La Renga, of whom he also has a tattoo. He is also an avid fan of The Simpsons, has tattoos of both Homer and Bart, and an English bulldog named Santa's Little Helper. Pratto has stated that he is a Boca Juniors supporter. He holds an Italian passport.

Career statistics

Club 
Statistics accurate as of 10 May 2021.

International

International goals
Scores and results list Argentina's goal tally first:

Honours
Universidad Católica
Primera División de Chile: 2010

Vélez Sarsfield
Primera División: 2012 Inicial
Copa Campeonato: 2013
Supercopa Argentina: 2013

Atlético Mineiro
Campeonato Mineiro: 2015

River Plate
Supercopa Argentina: 2017
Copa Libertadores: 2018
Copa Argentina: 2019
Recopa Sudamericana: 2019
Individual
Foreign Footballer of the Year of Chile: 2011
Vélez Sarsfield Player of the Year: 2013, 2014
Primera División de Argentina top scorer: 2014
Footballer of the Year of Argentina: 2014
Campeonato Mineiro Best Player: 2015
Campeonaro Mineiro Team of the Year: 2015
Campeonato Mineiro Best Goal: 2015
Bola de Prata: 2015
Campeonato Brasileiro Série A Best Foreign Player: 2015

References

External links
  
 
 
 Lucas Pratto at playmakerstats.com (English version of ogol.com.br)

1988 births
Living people
Footballers from La Plata
Argentine footballers
Association football forwards
Argentina international footballers
Boca Juniors footballers
Club Atlético Tigre footballers
Lyn Fotball players
Unión de Santa Fe footballers
Club Deportivo Universidad Católica footballers
Genoa C.F.C. players
Club Atlético Vélez Sarsfield footballers
Clube Atlético Mineiro players
São Paulo FC players
Club Atlético River Plate footballers
Feyenoord players
Argentine Primera División players
Eliteserien players
Chilean Primera División players
Serie A players
Campeonato Brasileiro Série A players
Copa Libertadores-winning players
Argentine expatriate footballers
Argentine expatriate sportspeople in Brazil
Argentine expatriate sportspeople in Chile
Argentine expatriate sportspeople in Italy
Argentine expatriate sportspeople in the Netherlands
Argentine expatriate sportspeople in Norway
Expatriate footballers in Brazil
Expatriate footballers in Chile
Expatriate footballers in Italy
Expatriate footballers in the Netherlands
Expatriate footballers in Norway
Argentine people of Italian descent